Ajay Kashyap is an Indian Bollywood film director. His directorial debut was Jaan Ki Baazi (1985). He followed it by directing Mera Haque (1986), Naam O Nishan (1987), Do Qaidi (1989) among others. Six of his films had Sanjay Dutt in starring roles. His last direction venture was The Coal Mafia (2012).

Filmography
Jaan Ki Baazi (1985)
Mera Haque (1986)
Naam O Nishan (1987)
Do Qaidi (1989)
Pathreela Raasta (1994)
The Coal Mafia (2012)

References

External links
 

Living people
Date of birth missing (living people)
Place of birth missing (living people)
Hindi-language film directors
Year of birth missing (living people)